Rice High School may refer to:
Rice High School (Manhattan, New York), New York City
Rice High School (Altair, Texas), Altair, Texas
Rice High School (Rice, Texas), Rice, Texas
Rice Memorial High School, South Burlington, Vermont
Brother Rice High School (Chicago, Illinois), Chicago, Illinois
Brother Rice High School (Michigan), Bloomfield Hills, Michigan
Sauk Rapids-Rice High School, Sauk Rapids, Minnesota